Ready is the second extended play by the South Korean boy group Victon. It was released on March 2, 2017 with the lead single "Eyez Eyez" by Plan A Entertainment and distributed by Kakao Entertainment.

Background and release 
The EP contains five songs, including the lead single "Eyez Eyez" which was produced by BeomxNang, who also produced the lead singles for their debut EP Voice to New World. Group member Do Han-se contributed lyrics to all five songs on the album, with members Han Seung-woo and Heo Chan also contributing to songwriting.

Commercial performance
The album peaked at number six on the Gaon weekly album chart, reaching the same peak in two separate weeks a month apart. By April 2017, the EP had sold 27,395 copies in South Korea.

Track listing

Charts

Weekly charts

Monthly chart

Sales

References 

2017 EPs
Victon EPs
Korean-language EPs